The Chief of Staff of the Armed Forces of Cape Verde (CEMFA) is a major-general, who is the highest-ranked officer in the Cape Verdean Armed Forces.

Chief of Staff

References 

Army chiefs of staff
Military of Cape Verde